Sébastien Roger Sansoni (born 30 January 1978) is a French former professional footballer.

Career
Sansoni is a defender who was born in Marseille and made his debut in professional football, being part of the Neuchâtel Xamax squad in the 1999–2000 season. He also played for FC Martigues, LB Châteauroux and Ethnikos Asteras before joining Vitesse Arnhem. In the 2006–07 season Sansoni held the Dutch headlines for biting in Roy Beerens' nose during an Eredivisie match between Vitesse and N.E.C., a Gelderland derby.

He signed for Russian Premier League side FC Khimki on 20 August 2009 until the end of the season. When the 2009 season ended he moved to Israel and signed for Maccabi Petah Tikva on 5 January 2010.

On 22 July 2012, after two years with Maccabi Petah Tikva he joined French CFA 2 club Étoile Sportive Pennoise, and continued his career on amateur level.

International career
Alongside Eric Cantona he became World Champion at the 2005 FIFA Beach Soccer World Cup.

References

External links
 Profile at footballdatabase.eu
 Sébastien Sansoni profile at Voetbal International

1978 births
Living people
Sportspeople from Hyères
Association football central defenders
French footballers
Neuchâtel Xamax FCS players
FC Martigues players
LB Châteauroux players
SBV Vitesse players
Ethnikos Asteras F.C. players
Maccabi Petah Tikva F.C. players
Expatriate footballers in Israel
Eredivisie players
French expatriate footballers
French expatriate sportspeople in Switzerland
Expatriate footballers in Switzerland
French expatriate sportspeople in Greece
Expatriate footballers in Greece
French expatriate sportspeople in the Netherlands
Expatriate footballers in the Netherlands
Expatriate footballers in Russia
French expatriate sportspeople in Israel
French expatriate sportspeople in Russia
FC Khimki players
Israeli Premier League players
Russian Premier League players
US Marseille Endoume players
French beach soccer players
Footballers from Provence-Alpes-Côte d'Azur